The 2014–15 Kent State Golden Flashes men's basketball team represented Kent State University during the 2014–15 NCAA Division I men's basketball season. The Golden Flashes, led by fourth year head coach Rob Senderoff, played their home games at the Memorial Athletic and Convocation Center, colloquially known as the MAC Center, as members of the East Division of the Mid-American Conference. They finished the season 23–12, 12–6 in MAC play to finish in a share for the East Division championship as well as a share of the MAC overall regular season championship. They lost in the quarterfinals of the MAC tournament to Akron. They were invited to the CollegeInsider.com Tournament where they defeated Middle Tennessee in the first round and Texas A&M Corpus–Christi in the second round before losing in the quarterfinals to Northern Arizona.

Roster

Schedule and results
Source: 

|-
!colspan=9 style="background:#F7BD0A; color:#131149;"| Non-Conference Games

|-
!colspan=9 style="background:#F7BD0A; color:#131149;"| Conference Games

|-
!colspan=9 style="background:#F7BD0A; color:#131149;"| MAC tournament

|-
!colspan=9 style="background:#F7BD0A; color:#131149;"| CIT

|-

See also
List of Kent State Golden Flashes men's basketball seasons

References

Kent State
Kent State Golden Flashes men's basketball seasons
Kent State
Kent State
Kent State